Károly Gombos (born 31 July 1954) is a Hungarian sports shooter. He competed in two events at the 1996 Summer Olympics.

References

1954 births
Living people
Hungarian male sport shooters
Olympic shooters of Hungary
Shooters at the 1996 Summer Olympics
Sport shooters from Budapest